Terms of Surrender is a studio album by American band Hiss Golden Messenger. It was released on September 20, 2019 under Merge Records. The album was produced by MC Taylor and Brad Cook.

Critical reception
Terms of Surrender was met with generally favorable reviews from critics. At Metacritic, which assigns a weighted average rating out of 100 to reviews from mainstream publications, this release received an average score of 78, based on 13 reviews.

Accolades

The album received a nomination for Best Americana Album at the 63rd Annual Grammy Awards.

Track listing

Personnel 

 MC Taylor - lead vocals, acoustic and electric guitars, banjo
 Phil Cook  - acoustic and electric pianos, organ, electric guitar, harmonica
 Brad Cook - bass guitar, mandolin, synths
 Aaron Dessner - electric guitar, high-strung acoustic guitar, piano
 Josh Kaufman - acoustic and electric guitars, lap steel, synths
 Matt McCaughan - drums, percussion, Omnichord
 Jenny Lewis - harmony vocals
 Alexandra Sauser-Monnig - harmony vocals
 Madalyn Stefanak - harmony vocals

Charts

References

2019 albums
Hiss Golden Messenger albums
Merge Records albums